Southwest Early College is a charter high school in Denver, Colorado, United States.

References

External links
Official site

Educational institutions established in 2004
Charter schools in Colorado
High schools in Denver
Public high schools in Colorado
2004 establishments in Colorado